Green Goddess refers to the Bedford RLHZ Self Propelled Pump, a fire engine used by the British Armed Forces.

Green Goddess may also refer to:

Arts and entertainment
 The Green Goddess (play), a 1920s stage play by William Archer
 The Green Goddess (1923 film), an American silent film adaptation of the play
 The Green Goddess (1930 film), an American talking picture remake of the 1923 film
The Green Goddess, a lost short film by Orson Welles, a prelude to his 1939 version of the play
 Green goddess, a fictional entity in the 1935 film serial The New Adventures of Tarzan and 1938 film Tarzan and the Green Goddess
 The Green Goddess, a 2001 album by Diabolique

Transportation
 Green Goddess (locomotive), on the Romney, Hythe and Dymchurch Railway, Kent, England
 Green Goddess (trams), ex-Liverpool trams in Glasgow, Scotland, in the 1950s
 Green Goddess, an early trolleybus in Adelaide, Australia
 Green Goddess, a 1948 Docker Daimler car
 , nicknamed Green Goddess, a Cunard cruise ship with a distinctive green livery

Other uses
 Green goddess dressing, a salad dressing containing anchovies
 Green goddess (salad), or Watergate salad
 'Green goddess', a cultivar of Zantedeschia aethiopica calla lily
 'Green goddess', a variety of cauliflower
 Green Goddess, a version of a GI cocktail
 Diana Moran (born 1939), nicknamed the Green Goddess, an English model, fitness expert and journalist
 Kenkyusha's New Japanese-English Dictionary, nicknamed "Green Goddess" for its distinctive dark-green cover

See also